Laporte, LaPorte, or La Porte may refer to:

Places

Canada
 Laporte, Saskatchewan, a hamlet
 Laporte (electoral district), a provincial electoral district in Quebec

Haiti
 La Porte, Les Cayes, Haiti, a village in the Les Cayes commune of Haiti

United States
La Porte, California
 Laporte, Colorado, part of the greater Fort Collins area
La Porte, Indiana, in of Northwest Indiana
LaPorte County, Indiana
 LaPorte High School (Indiana)
LaPorte Community School Corporation
La Porte Civic Auditorium
La Porte Municipal Airport
La Porte City, Iowa
Laporte, Michigan
Laporte, Minnesota
Laporte, Pennsylvania
Laporte Township, Sullivan County, Pennsylvania
 La Porte, Texas, part of the greater Houston area
 La Porte Municipal Airport (Texas)
 La Porte High School (Texas)
 La Porte Independent School District

People
 André Laporte (b. 1931), Belgian composer
 Aymeric Laporte (b. 1994), Spanish footballer
 Bernard Laporte (b. 1964), French rugby union coach and politician
 Éric Laporte (b. 1976), Canadian politician
 François-Louis Laporte, comte de Castelnau (1802–1880), French naturalist
 Frank LaPorte, American athlete
 Frankie LaPorte, American mobster
 Leo Laporte, radio and television host
 Leon J. LaPorte, United States Army General
 Otto Laporte (1902-1971), German-born American physicist
Laporte rule, a selection rule in spectroscopy, named after Otto Laporte
 Pierre Laporte, Canadian politician, assassinated in 1970.
 Stéphane Laporte (b. 1966), French javelin thrower
 Steve La Porte, American make-up artist.

Businesses
 Laporte plc, a British chemicals business
 LaPorte CPAs and Business Advisors

Science
 Laporte rule, a spectroscopic selection rule

See also
De la Porte
Delaporte
Osvaldo Laport, Uruguayan-Argentine actor